Cui Tu (born 854) was a poet of the late Tang dynasty, and two of whose poems were collected in the popular anthology Three Hundred Tang Poems.

Biography
Cui Tu lived toward the end of the Tang Dynasty.

Poetry
Cui Tu is best known for his two poems which are included in the Three Hundred Tang Poems, translated by Witter Bynner as "On New Year's Eve" and "A Solitary Wildgoose" .

Notes

References

Watson, Burton (1971). CHINESE LYRICISM: Shih Poetry from the Second to the Twelfth Century. New York: Columbia University Press. 
Wu, John C. H. (1972). The Four Seasons of Tang Poetry. Rutland, Vermont: Charles E.Tuttle. 

Three Hundred Tang Poems poets
Year of death unknown
Writers from Hangzhou
Year of birth unknown
9th-century Chinese poets
Poets from Zhejiang